Prasad Gaonkar (born 30 August 1976) is an Indian politician. He was elected to the Goa Legislative Assembly from Sanguem in the 2017 Goa Legislative Assembly election as an Independent MLA. He supported the Manohar Parrikar led government in 2017 and was Chairman of the Goa Forest Development Corporation.

References

1976 births
Living people
People from South Goa district
Goa MLAs 2017–2022
Independent politicians in India
Indian National Congress politicians